The 1957 Georgia Bulldogs football team represented the University of Georgia as a member of the Southeastern Conference (SEC) during the 1957 NCAA University Division football season. Led by 19th-year head coach Wally Butts, the Bulldogs compiled an overall record of 3–7 with a mark of 3–4 in conference play, placing ninth in the SEC.

Schedule

Roster
E Ken Cooper
FB Theron Sapp

References

Georgia
Georgia Bulldogs football seasons
Georgia Bulldogs football